NGT ( - English New Generation of Television) is a Brazilian television network. The station came about through the acquisition of two educational television concessions by businessman Marco Antônio Bernardes Costa; one in the city of Osasco, in the state of São Paulo, on behalf of the Fundação Fátima, and another in the city of Rio de Janeiro, on behalf of the Fundação Veneza. These concessions became the two headquarters of the network, together producing its national programming. The network has 35 affiliated television stations in 15 Brazilian states, as well as several retransmitters in 17 states, covering 13.6% of Brazilian territory.

Stations 
 NGT São Paulo (channel 16, virtual 48)
 NGT Rio de Janeiro (channel 45, virtual 12)

Programs 

 Anjos da Guarda
 Barlada
 Brazil Cook Book
 Caminhos do Rodeio
 Celeste Maria Recebe
 Cotidiano
 Desenhos Infantis
 Estilo
 Fala Galera!
 Festa Popular
 Jornal Metropolitano RJ
 Jornal Metropolitano SP
 Madrugadão NGT
 Mulheres em Ação
 Na Levada do Samba
 NGT Clipes
 NGT Esporte
 NGT Kids
 NGT Notícias
 NGT Séries
 Nordeste em Destaque com Fátima Dantas
 Os C&D
 Os Hermanos Perdidos no Brasil
 P.O.L.Í.C.I.A.
 Profissão Mulher
 Programa do Jacaré
 Serginho Total
 Sessão de Filmes
 Sessão de Shows
 Show do Balalá
 Temperando o Papo
 Viaja Brasil
 Programa Show Marques

External links
 Official Site

Television networks in Brazil
Portuguese-language television networks
Television channels and stations established in 2003
Mass media in Rio de Janeiro (city)
Mass media in São Paulo
Mass media in Osasco